Frederick Jones Bliss (22 January 1859-–3 June 1937) was an American archaeologist.

Biography

He was born in Mount Lebanon, Syria on 22 January 1859. His father, Daniel Bliss, was first a Congregational missionary and later president of the Syrian Protestant College, the future American University of Beirut. Frederick J. graduated from Amherst College (1880) and then taught at the Syrian Protestant College, thereafter attending Union Theological Seminary. After training under Flinders Petrie in Egypt, Bliss became involved with the Palestine Exploration Fund working in the field of Biblical archaeology at the site of Tell el-Hesi between 1894 and 1897, while concurrently leading an expedition that dug in Jerusalem, where he collaborated with A. C. Dickie.  Between 1898 and 1900, along with R.A.S. Macalister, Bliss excavated several sites in the Shephelah region of modern Israel, helping to improve the chronology of the region.  His excavation reports appeared frequently in the Quarterly Statement of the Palestine Exploration Fund, and included the first jar handle stamped by one of the Hebron LMLK seals (in 1899 simultaneously the first one with a 4-winged icon) as well as the first complete MMST inscription (in 1900).  He was dismissed as the head of the Fund in 1900 due to a disagreement with his peers over the handling of artefacts retrieved from archaeological digs and their transferal to Istanbul at the behest of the Ottoman authority. After the publication of his and Macalister's Excavations in Palestine in 1902, he was not active in the field.

Bibliography

References

External links
Frederick J. Bliss in The Palestine Exploration Fund 
Bliss Family Papers from the Amherst College Archives & Special Collections

1857 births
1939 deaths
American archaeologists
American expatriates in the Ottoman Empire

Amherst College alumni